Helena Vale was the original name for Midland Junction (now Midland) in Western Australia between 1885 and 1901. It was also the earlier name of the Midland Junction Municipality between 1895 and 1901.  The name has been long associated with the area between Midland and the Darling Scarp.

Rail branch 

The location had a short railway siding from the  Eastern Railway at Bellevue; it was opened on 1 July 1896 and closed on 13 February 1966. The siding was utilised for the transport of troops  during the First World War between Blackboy Hill and Fremantle.

Racecourse 
Despite the name changes of the locality and municipality, the name was kept by the Helena Vale Racecourse (founded in 1896/8) until its closure in the 1970s.

The former racecourse land was converted to an industrial area – known variously as the Farrall Road industrial area  or business centre – which has the Eastern Railway as its eastern boundary, Great Eastern Highway as its southern boundary and Morrison Road at its north side.

See also
 Bellevue railway station, Perth

Notes

Further reading
 Bourke, Michael J. (1987) On the Swan : a history of Swan District, Western Australia Nedlands, W.A : University of Western Australia Press for the Swan Shire Council, 1987.

Midland, Western Australia